Badlands is a 1989 arcade video game published by Atari Games. It was ported by Domark under the Tengen label to the Amiga, Amstrad CPC, Atari ST, Commodore 64, and ZX Spectrum. The game is a re-themed version of Atari's previous racing games Super Sprint and Championship Sprint with the addition of vehicular combat. Badlands is set in the aftermath of a nuclear war and races around abandoned wastelands with many hazards. Three gun-equipped cars race around a track to win prizes.

Gameplay

Badlands pits three cars against each other in a three lap race around a small, single-screen circuit. Bonuses are present in the form of wrenches which can be traded for goods such as extra speed, extra acceleration or better tires.

Unlike the Sprint games, Badlands expands upon the formula, taking place in a post-apocalyptic environment and equipping each of the players with cannons. In reality, the cannons do little except to slow cars down by repeatedly shooting at them, but the shop between levels offers the possibility of arming the car with missiles which will destroy the target car, placing it at a severe disadvantage as a replacement is brought onto the track, taking a few seconds.

The tracks also featured a number of new obstacles, including mines and retractable barricades.

Reception
Response to the Spectrum version was mixed. Your Sinclair and CRASH awarded average marks, both claiming in reviews of the original and rerelease that the title's contemporary Super Off-Road was superior. Sinclair User expressed more enthusiasm for the game, but made the same comparison to Super Off-Road.

Reviews
Computer and Video Games
Computer and Video Games
ACE (Advanced Computer Entertainment)
Commodore Format
ST Format
Sinclair User
All Game Guide
Retro Archives
Commodore Format
CPC Attack!
Your Sinclair
Computer and Video Games
Amiga Games
Power Play
Commodore User
The Good Old Days (Staff Reviews only)
Zzap!
Computer and Video Games
Amiga Power

Legacy
The game was re-released in 2005 as part of Midway Arcade Treasures 3 for the PlayStation 2, GameCube and Xbox. It was also re-released in 2006 as part of Midway Arcade Treasures Deluxe Edition for Microsoft Windows.

References

External links

Badlands at the Arcade History database

1989 video games
Amiga games
Amstrad CPC games
Arcade video games
Atari arcade games
Atari ST games
Commodore 64 games
Domark games
Midway video games
Post-apocalyptic video games
Teque London games
Top-down racing video games
Vehicular combat games
Video games about death games
Video games developed in the United States
Video games scored by Matt Furniss
ZX Spectrum games